Catlodge is a hamlet,  in the district of Newtonmore in Inverness-shire, Scottish Highlands and is in the Scottish council area of Highland. One of General Wade's military road, which is now the A889, built in the mid 18th century, passes through Catlodge, approaching from the south.

References

External links

Populated places in Badenoch and Strathspey